Flag Of Iron is a 1980 Shaw Brothers kung fu film directed by Chang Cheh and starring the Venom Mob.

Plot 
The master of the respectable and honored Iron Flag Clan (a clan that uses spears with flags as weapons) is murdered by the mysterious White-Robed Wanderer, an assassin hired by the elder brother of the clan Tsao Feng (Iron Tiger). Brother Lo (Iron Leopard) takes the heat when the authorities arrive to make an arrest and agrees to go away for a while. Tsao Feng offers to send him money, however money never arrives, only killers constantly trying to take Brother Lo's life. The White-Robed Wanderer arrives again, only this time to save Brother Lo from being murdered. White-Robed Wanderer admits to Lo that he killed his Chief but he was tricked into doing so by Tsao Feng so that Tsao Feng could take over not only the Iron Flag Clan but their rivals the Eagles. Lo and his brother Iron Monkey team up with the White-Robed Wanderer to go after Tsao Feng and take revenge for their murdered chief.

Cast
Kuo Chui as 'Iron Leopard' Lo Hsin
Chiang Sheng as 'Iron Monkey' Yuan Lang
Wang Li as Kao Tung
Lu Feng as 'Iron Tiger' Tsao Feng
Lung Tung Sheng as 'White-Robed Wanderer' Yen Hsiu

External links 
 Flag of Iron at Hong Kong Cinemagic
 
 

1980 films
Hong Kong martial arts films
Shaw Brothers Studio films
Kung fu films
Films directed by Chang Cheh
1980s Mandarin-language films
1980s Hong Kong films